Mathew David Osman (born 9 October 1967) is an English musician and author, best known as the bassist in the rock band Suede. Osman and singer Brett Anderson are the only remaining founding members left in Suede, and perform along with the drummer Simon Gilbert, who has appeared on many Suede albums.

Biography
Osman was born in Welwyn Garden City, Hertfordshire, but was raised mainly in Haywards Heath, West Sussex. Osman's younger brother is the presenter, author, and comedian Richard Osman. He studied at the London School of Economics where in 1989, he was awarded a BSc in Economics.

Osman met future Suede lead singer Brett Anderson in Haywards Heath, and they played together in early garage bands such as The Pigs and Suave And Elegant. Osman co-wrote some of Suede's songs, including "Lost in TV", "Europe Is Our Playground", "Attitude" and "Golden Gun". After Suede broke up in 2003, Osman provided music for television programmes, such as 8 Out of 10 Cats, The Marriage Ref and You Have Been Watching. He returned to perform with Suede when the band reformed in 2010.

Osman was the London editor of the email magazine le cool and the editor of their London guidebook, published in summer 2008. His writing has also been published in British magazines and newspapers including The Guardian, The Independent and The Observer.

Osman's first novel The Ruins was published in February 2020 by Repeater Books and his second, The Ghost Theatre, was acquired by Bloomsbury Publishing in 2022. He co-authored the book England on Fire with Stephen Ellcock,

Discography

With Suede

Suede (1993)
Dog Man Star (1994)
Coming Up (1996)
Head Music (1999)
A New Morning (2002)
Bloodsports (2013)
Night Thoughts (2016)
The Blue Hour (2018)
Autofiction (2022)

References

External links

Mat Osman discography on Discogs
Mat Osman website

1967 births
Living people
Alumni of the London School of Economics
English rock bass guitarists
Male bass guitarists
Suede (band) members
Britpop musicians
Alternative rock bass guitarists
English songwriters
People from Welwyn Garden City